Gilt-bronze Buddha with Inscription: “Seventh Year of Yeonga” is the oldest Buddhist sculpture with an inscribed date that has ever been found in Korea. The inscription on the back of the halo states that it was produced in 539 in the Goguryeo Kingdom. Adapting the overall style of Buddhist sculpture from China’s Northern Wei Dynasty with domestic elements, this statue is viewed as one of the first attempts to establish and assert Korean aesthetics. It is currently exhibited in the Buddhist Sculpture Gallery of the National Museum of Korea.

References 

Buddhist sculpture
Korean sculpture
Buddhism in Korea
Korean culture
539